Surosa is an unincorporated community in Mingo County, West Virginia, United States. Their post office no longer exists.

The community's name is an amalgamation of Sue and Rose, the wives of two mining officials.

References 

Unincorporated communities in West Virginia
Unincorporated communities in Mingo County, West Virginia